Senator Hendee may refer to:

George Whitman Hendee (1832–1906), Vermont State Senate
Kirby Hendee (1923–2016), Wisconsin State Senate